Israel competed at the 2012 Summer Olympics in London, from 27 July to 12 August 2012. This was the nation's fifteenth appearance at the Summer Olympics.

The Olympic Committee of Israel sent 37 athletes to the Games, 19 men and 18 women, to compete in 9 sports. The nation's team size was smaller by six athletes from the previous games (in contrast to 43 athletes who competed in Beijing, which was the nation's largest delegation to that point). This was also the youngest delegation in Israel's Olympic history, with about half the team under the age of 23, and many of the team members were expected to reach their peak in time for the 2016 Summer Olympics in Rio de Janeiro. Sixteen athletes had competed in Beijing, including windsurfer and bronze medalist Shahar Tzuberi, who was the nation's flag bearer at the opening ceremony.

Judoka Ariel Ze'evi, four-time European champion and bronze medalist at the 2004 Summer Olympics, became the third Israeli athlete in history to compete at four Olympic games, and was also the oldest athlete on the team, at age 35. Six athletes made their third Olympic appearance: tennis men's doubles team Jonathan Erlich and Andy Ram, synchronized swimming pair Anastasia Gloushkov and Inna Yoffe, and sailors Gideon Kliger, world bronze medalist in the men's 470 class, and Vered Buskila in the women's 470 class.

According to Zvi Warshaviak, the head of the Israel Olympic Committee, approximately eight athletes were considered medal contenders in sailing, gymnastics, judo, and shooting; however, none of them reached their expectations in the results, and Israel failed to win a single medal for the first time since 1988. Windsurfer Lee Korzits, backstroke swimmer Yakov-Yan Toumarkin, floor gymnast Alexander Shatilov, and rhythmic gymnast Neta Rivkin qualified successfully for the final rounds of their respective sports, but missed out of the medal standings.

Prior to the Olympics, the BBC's list of countries competing, did not list Jerusalem as Israel's capital, however listed East Jerusalem as the capital of Palestine. The BBC eventually listed Jerusalem as the capital after complaints from the Prime Ministers Office.

Competitors

Athletics

Key
 Note – Ranks given for track events are within the athlete's heat only
 Q = Qualified for the next round
 q = Qualified for the next round as a fastest loser or, in field events, by position without achieving the qualifying target
 NR = National record
 N/A = Round not applicable for the event
 Bye = Athlete not required to compete in round

Men

Women

Badminton

Gymnastics

Artistic
Men

Women

Rhythmic

Judo

Sailing

Men

Women

Shooting

Men

Swimming

Men

Women

Synchronized swimming

Tennis

See also
 Israel at the 2012 Summer Paralympics

References

External links

Israel at the London 2012 Games news, articles and videos
Israel at the Olympic Movement official website
Israel - 2012 Olympic News, Athletes, Medals results, schedules

Summer Olympics
Nations at the 2012 Summer Olympics
2012